Yours, Mine & Ours is a 2005 American family comedy film directed by Raja Gosnell and starring Rene Russo and Dennis Quaid. It concerns a blended family with 18 children. It is a remake of the 1968 film of the same name, which in turn was based on the 1965 book Who Gets the Drumstick? by Helen Beardsley. It was released on November 23, 2005. It was produced by Metro-Goldwyn-Mayer, Nickelodeon Movies, and Robert Simonds Company, and was distributed by Paramount Pictures and Columbia Pictures. It was panned by critics and grossed $72 million against a $45 million budget.

Plot 
Widowed U.S. Coast Guard Rear Admiral Frank Beardsley moves back to his hometown of New London, Connecticut, with his eight children from his first marriage. After he and Helen North, a widowed handbag designer by trade with 10 children (four biological, six adopted), unexpectedly encounter each other at a restaurant while on separate dates, they do so again at their 30-year high school reunion.

Instantly rekindling their old sparks, Frank and Helen quickly decide to marry in a private ceremony, shocking both sets of children. They move into a new home on the same property where they shared their first kiss, joined by the North children's numerous pets (including a pot-bellied pig), and Frank's housekeeper, Mrs. Munion. It soon becomes apparent that Frank's very regimented view of doing things clashes with Helen's more free-spirited, laissez-faire attitude. Their respective children, shocked by the news of their quick wedding, initially do not get along well, even turning a planned lighthouse renovation project into an all-out paint fight.

Frank's oldest son, William, calls a meeting with his siblings and explains that they can rid themselves of their new situation by joining forces to make Frank and Helen's respective philosophical differences apparent, which will cause them to fight. However, while doing so, they gradually begin to bond, attending their siblings' soccer games and helping William in his class president campaign.

A short time later, Frank and Helen attend a formal Coast Guard dinner where his superior, Commandant Sherman, officially offers him the opportunity to be his successor. He respectfully declines it, citing both his obligation to the Coast Guard Academy and his new family. Meanwhile, as the young children have a food fight upstairs in the bedroom, the older ones throw a wild party downstairs, which quickly grows uncontrollable. When Frank and Helen return to find the place in total chaos, Frank is furious, and while also upset, Helen's more laidback approach only angers him more. This causes their worst fight yet, and the children, realizing how happy Frank and Helen have been together, begin to realize that they might have pushed things too far.

The next day, Frank informs Helen that he has decided to take the position as Commandant after all, and they schedule a family meeting to inform the children. As the children return home from school, jubilant over having defended their younger siblings from bullies and with the news of William having won the class election, Frank quickly deflates the mood by telling them of his decision to accept the new position. Feeling guilty for having torn him and Helen apart, they set about undoing their mistakes, with the younger children enlisting Helen to aid in their efforts. Together, the older ones launch the family's boat in an effort to intercept Frank (thereby fulfilling his previous dream of having an all-family sailing team that failed earlier), but he is convinced that Helen no longer wants to be with him, until he sees her turn on the lighthouse spotlight (referencing a story he had told her earlier about a beautiful female lighthouse keeper). Successfully reunited, they marry once again, this time with the children involved.

Cast 
 Rene Russo as Helen North Beardsley
 Dennis Quaid as Franklin "Frank" Beardsley
 Rip Torn as Admiral Sherman, Commandant of the Coast Guard
 Linda Hunt as Mrs. Munion
 Jerry O'Connell as Max Algrant
 David Koechner as Captain Darrell Edwards
 Jenica Bergere as Claudia
 Josh Henderson as Nick De Pietro
 Dan Mott as Pizza Delivery Guy

The Beardsley Children
 Sean Faris as William Beardsley
 Katija Pevec as Christina Beardsley
 Dean Collins as Harry Beardsley
 Tyler Patrick Jones as Michael Beardsley
 Haley Ramm as Kelly Beardsley
 Brecken Palmer as Ely Beardsley
 Bridger Palmer as Otter Beardsley
 Ty Panitz as Ethan Beardsley

The North Children
 Drake Bell as Dylan North
 Danielle Panabaker as Phoebe North
 Lil' JJ as Jimi North
 Miki Ishikawa as Naoko North
 Miranda Cosgrove as Joni North
 Slade Pearce as Mick North
 Andrew Vo as Lau North
 Jennifer Habib as Bina North
 Jessica Habib as Marisa North
 Nicholas Roget-King as Aldo North

Release

Promotion  
Quaid and some of the child actors appeared on the November 22, 2005 episode of Dr. Phil to promote the film.

Box office 
The film opened at number three behind Harry Potter and the Goblet of Fire and Walk the Line, with an opening weekend of $17.5 million in the US. Its final North American box office was $53.4 million and its international box office was $19.3 million, earning a combined total of  $72.7 million, against its $45 million production budget.

Reception 
On Rotten Tomatoes, the film has an approval rating of 6% based on 107 reviews, with an average rating of 3.3/10. The site's critical consensus reads, "The initial set-up is unbelievable, the plotting is predictable and stale, and the comedy depends on repetitive pratfalls that soon get old." On Metacritic, it has a weighted average score of 38 out of 100 based on 25 critics, indicating "generally unfavorable reviews". Audiences polled by CinemaScore gave it an average grade of "A−" on an A+ to F scale.

Soundtrack 
Hawk Nelson performed a song featuring Drake Bell, entitled "Bring Em' Out", as the film's main theme song. The group itself performs during the party sequence.

Home media
The film was released on VHS and DVD on February 28, 2006, and on Blu-ray on February 2, 2021.

References

External links 

 
 
 

2005 comedy films
2005 films
American comedy films
Remakes of American films
Films set in Connecticut
Films about families
Films about marriage
Films about the United States Coast Guard
Films about weddings
Films about widowhood
Love stories
Films scored by Christophe Beck
Films directed by Raja Gosnell
Paramount Pictures films
Metro-Goldwyn-Mayer films
Nickelodeon Movies films
Columbia Pictures films
Films about siblings
American children's comedy films
Films about parenting
2000s English-language films
2000s American films